Santiago Ramírez Morales (born 20 July 1994) is a Colombian track cyclist. He competed in the team sprint at the 2014 UCI Track Cycling World Championships.

Major results
2013
 UCI World Cup
2nd  Keirin, Guadalajara
2021
 UCI Nations Cup
1st  Overall Kilometer
3rd  Keirin, Cali
3rd  Kilometer, Cali
2022
 UCI Nations Cup
1st  Overall Kilometer
2nd  Kilometer, Milton
2nd  Kilometer, Cali
2nd  Team sprint, Cali

References

External links
 
 
 
 
 

1994 births
Living people
Colombian track cyclists
Colombian male cyclists
Place of birth missing (living people)
Olympic cyclists of Colombia
Cyclists at the 2016 Summer Olympics
Pan American Games medalists in cycling
Pan American Games gold medalists for Colombia
Cyclists at the 2015 Pan American Games
Cyclists at the 2019 Pan American Games
Medalists at the 2019 Pan American Games
20th-century Colombian people
21st-century Colombian people
South American Games silver medalists for Colombia
South American Games medalists in cycling